Vitali Miroslavovich Koberskiy (born February 25, 1946) is a Russian professional football coach and a former player.

Career
Koberskiy's father, Miroslav, was a former football player born in Kyiv of Polish ethnic origins who moved to Khabarovsk from Ukraine. He managed local side FC Zaria Khabarovsk where his son Vitali began his football career. Koberskiy began playing professional football with FC SKA-Khabarovsk before joining FC Dinamo Minsk where he played in the Soviet Top League.

After he retired from playing, Koberskiy became a football manager. He led Russian Second Division side FC Oryol during 1997. In 2004, he managed Second Division sides FC Slavyansk Slavyansk-na-Kubani and FC Kavkaztransgaz Izobilny.

Personal
His son Denis Koberskiy also was a football player.

References

External links
Profile at Footballfacts.ru

1946 births
Living people
Soviet footballers
FC SKA-Khabarovsk players
FC Dinamo Minsk players
FC Metalist Kharkiv players
Soviet football managers
Russian football managers
FC Luch Vladivostok managers
FC Oryol managers
Association football midfielders